The Estonia national futsal team represents Estonia during international futsal competitions such as the FIFA Futsal World Cup and the European Championships. It was formed in 2007 and is under the direction of the Estonian Football Association.

Competition history

FIFA Futsal World Cup

UEFA European Futsal Championship

Confederations Cup

Minor tournaments

Current squad
The squad named for the 2015 Baltic Cup played on 27–29 November 2015. Caps and goals are as of 25 March 2016.

|-----
! colspan="9" bgcolor="#B0D3FB" align="left" |
|----- bgcolor="#DFEDFD"

|}

Managers

References

External links
Team info on Estonian Football Association 

European national futsal teams
Futsal in Estonia
National sports teams of Estonia